Columbia was an American brand of automobiles produced by a group of companies in the United States. They included the Pope Manufacturing Company of Hartford, Connecticut, the Electric Vehicle Company, and an entity of brief existence in 1899, the Columbia Automobile Company.

In 1908, the company was renamed the Columbia Motor Car Company and in 1910 was acquired by United States Motor Company. A different Columbia Motors existed from 1917 to 1924.

Electric models

The 1904 'Columbia Brougham' was equipped with a tonneau. Twin electric motors were situated at the rear of the car. Similar 'Columbia' coupes, 'Columbia Hansom' cabs, or hansoms, were also produced for the same price. They could achieve .
 

The 'Columbia Surrey' and 'Columbia Victoria' were more traditional horseless carriages.

At the bottom end of the range was the 'Columbia Runabout' car.  Priced at just , it used a single electric motor, with an Exide battery and Concord springs.

Columbia's basic runabout was typical of the time, resembling a horseless carriage, and was steered via a tiller. It cost ,  more than the contemporary Curved Dash Oldsmobile. The drivetrain had clear evolutionary roots in Pope's bicycle business, driving the rear axle via a chain drive (typical of automobiles of the era), producing virtually the only operating noise. Between the motor and the chain drive was a transmission with three forward and two reverse speeds. Twenty batteries manufactured by Exide Batteries, also associated with Electric Vehicle Company, were placed above both axles in order to balance the weight. Brakes on both rear wheels featured a bell, which rang when the vehicle reached a full stop.

Besides the runabout, Columbia manufactured about 20 other models including taxis, police cars, and buses.  The vehicles were most popular in cities, where relatively smooth roads made the electric motor, with its smoothness and silence, appear superior over the gasoline engine. It helped in urban areas that electrical supply for recharging was easily found within the runabout's  range. Nevertheless, in 1903, a Columbia was driven  from Boston to New York City in 23 hours. In keeping with this urban orientation, the Columbia was positioned as a high-end vehicle (even at a time when automobiles were very expensive), with its showroom across the street from the Metropolitan Opera House in New York.

Internal Combustion engined models
 
  
The Columbia Touring Car was an entirely different car. A touring car model, it used a tonneau, seating 6 passengers, and resembled the touring models offered by many other companies at the time. A 4-speed sliding transmission was fitted. One design innovation was the "false frame" supporting the engine.

A Knight sleeve valve powered model was added to the range in 1912 and 1913.

See also
Brass Era car
History of the electric vehicle
United States Motor Company
List of defunct United States automobile manufacturers

References

 
 David Burgess Wise, The New Illustrated Encyclopedia of Automobiles,

External links

Columbia Automobile Company page
the actress Julia Marlowe and her dog in one of the company's electric cars

Veteran vehicles
Electric vehicles introduced in the 20th century
Cars powered by Knight engines
Defunct motor vehicle manufacturers of the United States
Vehicle manufacturing companies established in 1899
American companies established in 1899
Car brands
Highwheeler
1890s cars
1900s cars
1910s cars